Ethyl phenyl ether (or phenetole) is an organic compound that belongs to a class of compounds called ethers. Ethyl phenyl ether has the same properties as some other ethers, such as volatility, explosive vapors, and the ability to form peroxides. It will dissolve in less polar solvents such as ethanol or ether, but not in polar solvents such as water.

Preparation

PhOH + NaOH —————> Ph–O–Na

Ph–O–Na + Et2SO4 ——————> Ph–O–Et

This reaction follows Sn2 path.

See also
 Anisole

Notes

Additional references
 Organic Chemistry, Fessenden & Fessenden, 6th Edition, Ralph J. Fessenden et al.
 For Antoine constants: http://webbook.nist.gov/cgi/cbook.cgi?ID=C103731&Units=SI&Mask=4#ref-10

Phenol ethers
Phenyl compounds